Anjali Sharma (born 2004) is an Australian climate activist, who at the age of 16, was the lead litigant in a class action in the Australian Federal Court, against the Federal government, and in particular, the then Minister for the Environment, Sussan Ley, for failing to consider the impacts of climate change. Sharma was also a finalist in the 2021 Children's Climate Prize, an International prize for climate activism, based in Sweden.

Early life and career 

Sharma is a high school student from Melbourne, who took the Australian federal government, and Minister for the Environment at the time, Sussan Ley, to the Federal Court of Australia in a class action. She was the lead litigant, together with seven other school students, and a nun, Sister Marie Brigid Arthur. The class action asked the Federal Court to stop Minister for the Environment at the time, Ley, from approving an expansion to the coalmine Vickery, near Gunnedah, in NSW. The Federal Court ruled, in a world first, that the Minister for the Environment was required to have a duty of care towards teenagers and children, with respect to climate change impacts, and in particular bushfire and heatwave impacts. This set a precedent for following court cases. Also undisputed was that (2) Australia will experience more drought, heatwave extremes and fire related weather. Further, it was undisputed that (3) these effects and their extent will be influenced by the extent of greenhouse gases emitted.

The Court of Justice, Justice Mordecai Bromberg, ruled that the Minister for the Environment had a "duty of care" to not harm the youth or their future. He ruled that the Minister had "a duty to take reasonable care to avoid causing personal injury" to youth and children of Australia, when the Minister for the Environment, made a decision about the extension of the coal mining project under the legislation, Environment Protection and Biodiversity Conservation Act [1999]. The aim, as stated by the teenagers, was to stop or prevent the expansion of future fossil fuel projects in the future.

The eight Australian teenagers who brought the class action were Anjali Sharma, Isolde Shanti Raj-Seppings, Ambrose Malachy Hayes, Tomas Webster Arbizu, Bella Paige Burgemeister, Laura Fleck Kirwan, Ava Princi and Luca Gwyther Saunders. Due to the young age of the applicants, all under 18, they were represented by a litigation representative, Sister Marie Brigid Arthur, a sister of the Brigadine Order of Victoria.

Sharma's actions and court case are likely to set legal precedent in future court cases in Australia where the impact of climate change, including death and injury from heat waves, bushfire and storms, need to be considered in coal and fossil fuel mining decisions. Sharma's case was one of many as part of the 'legal surge' in climate action cases, where the US and Australia lead the number of climate action court cases, with many being led by teenagers.  As at December 2021, there were 21 court cases involving climate change, including the Sharma and others vs the Minister for the Environment appeal case.

An expanded explanation of Sharma and others vs Minister for the Environment reported that the Court issued a declaration that "the Minister has a reasonable duty to avoid causing death or injury to person's who were under 18 years of age and ordinarily resident in Australia at the time of the commencement of this proceeding arising from emissions of carbon dioxide into the Earth’s atmosphere."

In March 2022, it was reported that the Australian government won an appeal against the ruling and hence overturned the case.

Writing in The Guardian in April 2022, just prior to the general election, Sharma tackled the lack of political will in Australia: "[W]ith 114new fossil fuel projects in the pipeline, and a two-party system with deeply ingrained ties to big coal and gas, what our major parties are promising is the exact opposite [of a satisfactory response]".

Media and legal implications 

Sharma's case, the implications for climate change, the youth of the team of the class action, and the historic precedent set by the results, have received much media and legal attention, both within Australian, Indian and British media outlets. Her case has been reported on, by SBS, the Sydney Morning Herald, the Guardian, and The Australian. The case is now considered a precedent, which has now has the power to inform other cases, to ensure that climate impacts are considered.

Sharma's work led to the conclusion that within Australian law, the Minister for the Environment has a duty to avoid causing personal injury and death to Australian children from carbon emissions which can lead to heatwaves and bushfires, when approving coal projects. Sharma's activism led to her being nominated as a finalist in Children's climate prize. This is an "international prize annually awarded to young people who have made extraordinary efforts for the climate and environment."

Prizes and awards

References

Living people
Climate justice
Australian women activists
2004 births
Youth climate activists